Baltimore Coliseum was an indoor arena in Baltimore, Maryland.  It hosted the NBA's original Baltimore Bullets from 1944 until 1954. Prior to that it hosted roller skating events.

The Coliseum was built in 1938 on the corner of Monroe Street and Windsor Avenue near the Pennsylvania Avenue entertainment area and held 4,500 people. As a professional sports venue, it had been superseded by the Baltimore Civic Center in 1961, which prompted the Coliseum's closure not long after. The building, after over four decades of disuse, was demolished in July 2008. The Center for Urban Families (CFUF) now stands on the site.

References 

Basketball venues in Maryland
Baltimore Bullets (1944–1954) venues
Basketball Association of America venues
Defunct basketball venues in the United States
Defunct indoor arenas in the United States
Defunct sports venues in Maryland
1930 establishments in Maryland
Sports venues completed in 1930
Sports venues demolished in 2008
1961 disestablishments in Maryland
Demolished sports venues in Maryland